The Wish 107.5 Music Awards (abbreviated as WMA) is an annual accolade presented by the FM radio station Wish 107.5, which aims to pay tribute to acts and artists who have given significant contributions in the music scene in the Philippines. The awards ceremony is held annually every January at the Smart Araneta Coliseum, with the exception of the 2019 edition which was held at the Mall of Asia Arena.

Winners are determined through the votes of fans (also called Wishers) (20%) and a panel of judges (80%). Wishers can cast their votes via the WMA website (using a Facebook and/or Twitter account), the Wish app, and the Wish YouTube channel. WMA polling sites are also put up in key establishments across the Philippines.

Apart from the usual award-giving repertoire, the Wish Music Awards distinguishes itself from other bodies as it incorporates the concept of wish granting. During WMAs, Wish hands out ₱100,000 to the chosen beneficiaries of every major award winner. This comes on top of the ₱25,000 cash prize that the artists themselves receive. Since the awards show was first held in 2016, it has already doled out a total of ₱7.125 million to different OPM acts and their hand-picked philanthropic organizations.

Award Categories

Major Categories

Wishclusive Performance of the Year 
The Wishclusive Performance of the Year awards are given to the best Wishclusive (Wish-exclusive) performances inside the Wish 107.5 Bus.

 Wishclusive Ballad Performance of the Year

 Wishclusive Collaboration of the Year

 Wishclusive Contemporary Folk Performance of the Year

 Wishclusive Hip-Hop Performance of the Year

 Wishclusive Pop Performance of the Year

 Wishclusive R&B Performance of the Year

 Wishclusive Rock/Alternative Performance of the Year

 Wishclusive Urban/Contemporary R&B Performance of the Year

 Wishclusive Performance of the Year

 Wishclusive Best Cover of the Year

 Wishclusive Performance of the Year by an International Artist

Song of the Year 
The Song of the Year awards are given to the best songs by genre.
 Wish Original Song of the Year

 Wish Ballad Song of the Year

Wish Contemporary Folk Song of the Year

 Wish Hip-Hop Song of the Year

 Wish Pop Song of the Year

 Wish R&B Song of the Year

 Wish Rock/Alternative Song of the Year

 Wish Urban/Contemporary R&B Song of the Year

Artist of the Year 
The Artist of the Year awards are given to the best solo artist, group, and new solo artist.
 Wish Artist of the Year

 Wish Group of the Year

 Wish Promising/Breakthrough Artist of the Year

 Wish Young Artist of the Year

Special Awards 
 Wishers' Choice Award

 Wishclusive Viral Videos of the Year 

 Wish Reactors' Choice

 Wishers' Choice Artist of the Year

 Wishers' Choice Performance of the Year

Elite Circle of Awards 
Every year, the Wish 107.5 Music Awards honors artists whose Wishclusive performances have fared well in the music community through the Wishclusive Elite Circle Award.

The view-count-based recognition serves as the highest citation given during every WMA. From the original December 31, the cut-off date has been moved to October 31 starting year 2018 to coincide with the WMA nominations' eligibility period (November 1, 2017 until October 31, 2018).

Depending on the YouTube hits achieved by a Wishclusive video on the cut-off, an artist can receive the following awards:
 Diamond Wishclusive Elite Circle for 100 million views

 Platinum Wishclusive Elite Circle for 75 million views

 Gold Wishclusive Elite Circle for 50 million views

 Silver Wishclusive Elite Circle for 25 million views

 Bronze Wishclusive Elite Circle for 10 million views

Ceremonies

1st Wish 107.5 Awards 
The inaugural year of the WMA was held on January 26, 2016, at the Smart Araneta Coliseum. With the theme, "Your Coolest Musical Experience," Wish 107.5 celebrated the then-budding popularity of the country's first-ever FM-on-wheels, the Wish 107.5 Bus.

2nd Wish 107.5 Awards 
Wish 107.5 has successfully staged its 2nd Wish 107.5 Music Awards on January 16, 2017, at the Smart Araneta Coliseum. The revelry themed, "Your WISHclusive Gateway to the World," held Filipino musicality in high esteem and paid tribute to the artists who lifted OPM to global recognition.

A total of 75 artists vied in 13 categories. Three special awards were also handed out, namely Wish Reactors' Choice, WISHclusive Viral Video of the Year, and WISHclusive Elite Circle.

3rd Wish 107.5 Awards 
Wish 107.5 held the third edition of the Wish Music Awards on January 15, 2018, at the Smart Araneta Coliseum. The event, themed "Taking Filipino Music Across the Globe," was a fitting homage to the artists who continue the world-class legacy of our country's homegrown music and talent.

Making the winners' success more meaningful was the opportunity to give cash donations to their chosen beneficiaries. While those who bagged major awards received Php 25,000, their respective charitable groups were granted with Php 100,000.

Wish 107.5 has shelled out a total of Php 2.125 million for this year alone.

4th Wish 107.5 Awards 
More than 80 artists whose songs were released and Wishclusives were rendered from November 1, 2017, to October 31, 2018, are nominated in the 18 categories of the 4th Wish 107.5 Music Awards. The awards night is slated on January 15, 2019, at the Smart Araneta Coliseum.

5th Wish 107.5 Awards 
Unlike previous Wish awards, the 2020 event was held on a Sunday and at the SM Mall of Asia Arena instead.

6th Wish 107.5 Awards 

Due to the imposed regulations for the mitigation of the COVID-19 pandemic in the Philippines, the 2021 edition of the awards was streamed live through Wish 107.5's official YouTube channel on January 17, 2021, and held at an audience-less Smart Araneta Coliseum. All performers of the awards ceremony, along with the hosts, organizers and certain invited nominees underwent swab testing and followed protocols in order to ensure their health and safety.

7th Wish 107.5 Awards 
The 2022 edition was initially projected to be the first live audience event since the pandemic. It was originally set to happen on January 16, 2022, at the Smart Araneta Coliseum with performances from Billboard Music Awards and MTV Europe Music Awards nominee SB19, fellow MTV Europe Music Awards nominee Ben&Ben, as well as notable Filipino artists juan karlos, Lyca Gairanod, and more. Guests will be required to provide negative COVID-19 results, while audience members are expected to follow standard health and safety protocols. However, due to a surge in COVID-19 cases in the country caused by the Omicron variant, the event cancelled it's admission of live audience before being postponed to January 30, 2022, and moved to the New Frontier Theater.

Statistics

Most Awards by Artist (including Elite Circle)

Most Nominations by Artist

Wish Hall of Fame Awards

See also 
 Ang Dating Daan
A Song of Praise Music Festival
Radyo La Verdad 1350
 UNTV News & Rescue
 Wish 107.5
Members Church of God International
 NU Rock Awards
Mnet Asian Music Awards

Notes

References

External links 
 Wish Music Awards Official Website

 
Members Church of God International
2016 establishments in the Philippines
Annual events in the Philippines
Awards established in 2016
Charities based in the Philippines
Events in Metro Manila
Philippine music awards
Recurring events established in 2016
Award ceremonies in the Philippines